Xtro 3: Watch the Skies (sometimes credited as Xtro: Watch the Skies) is a 1995 science-fiction horror thriller film directed by Harry Bromley Davenport and starring Sal Landi, Andrew Divoff, Karen Moncrieff and Jim Hanks. It is the third film in the low-budget British science fiction/horror Xtro series.

Plot
In a rundown motel, Lieutenant Martin Kirn (Sal Landi) meets with a reporter to tell what happened on his final military mission. He wants the story told

Since at least World War II, the United States government has successfully covered up very real proof of U.F.O.s. However, when a group of U.S. Marines is dispatched to a deserted island to diffuse an old ordinance. The military task force is not made-up of elite military units.

Kim learns that Captain Fetterman (Andrew Divoff) chose the soldiers for the mission as they are expendable. Despite their inadequacies, they soon suspect something is amiss about the mission. They uncover unsettling evidence, old films documenting brutal medical experiments on alien and find one person living on the island who Fetterman wants dead

They then discover a lone surviving alien out for revenge, and a military intelligence plot to sacrifice them and conceal existence of the encounter. The military is concerned the shroud of mystery is about to be lifted and decide to abandon the marines. The lone person living on the island had conducted experiments on the alien before the alien had escaped.

Cast
 Sal Landi as Lieutenant Martin Kirn
 Andrew Divoff as Captain Fetterman
 Karen Moncrieff as J.G. Watkins
 David M. Parker as Corporal Dermot Reilly
 Jim Hanks as Private Friedman
 Andrea Lauren Herz as Private Banta
 Daryl Haney as Private Hendricks
 Nigel Gibbs as Smythe
 Robert Culp as Major Guardino
 Brian Cavanaugh as Wolf
 Paul Hayes as Mr. Atkins
 Jeanne Mori as Erica Stern
 Al Ruscio as The General
 Martin Starr as Biff Atkins

Production

Director Harry Bromley's first film in America. The movie has no direct links to the first two films

Reception

Creature Feature gave the film 3 out of 5 stars, finding that film has moments of inspiration, but fining a problem with the ending. Monster Hunter found the movie smart in theory but lacking in execution. In addition, it noted the film could be brutal. Letterbox DVD gave the film 3.5 stars out of 5, noting that while it had a low budget, and borrows some from the movie Predator (film), that there are enough original ideas to make the film worthwhile.

Home media

The film has been released on DVD twice. The first DVD was released in 1999 by Image Entertainment, who coincidentally, would release the first two entries in the Xtro series on DVD years later. In 2005, the film was released yet again on DVD by Showcase Entertainment. Both DVDs are now discontinued.

In 2020, Xtro 3 was released on Blu-ray by Vinegar Syndrome. Extras include new interviews with director Harry Bromley Davenport and screenwriter Daryl Haney.

References

External links

1995 films
1990s English-language films
British science fiction horror films
British monster movies
1990s science fiction horror films
1995 horror films
1990s monster movies
Films with screenplays by Daryl Haney
Films about extraterrestrial life
Films directed by Harry Bromley Davenport
1990s British films